Mega Man 11 is an action-platform game developed and published by Capcom. The game is an entry in the original Mega Man series, and was released worldwide for Nintendo Switch, PlayStation 4, Windows, and Xbox One in October 2018. The game was ported to Amazon Luna on September 9, 2021. The game brings back several features such as voice acting and a 2.5D graphic style from previous games throughout the Mega Man franchise.

Gameplay
Mega Man 11 retains the gameplay style of the classic Mega Man series of games, and features a 2.5D graphics style with 3D polygonal characters and 2D environments. Players control Mega Man in an attempt to stop Dr. Wily from using the Double Gear system that he invented many years before when he was at Robot University.  Players travel through eight linear stages, which can be chosen in any way the player sees fit, and have to face Doctor Wily's newest Robot Masters, including Block Man, Fuse Man, Blast Man, Acid Man, Tundra Man, Torch Man, Impact Man (known as Pile Man in Japan), and Bounce Man (known as Rubber Man in Japan). 

Mega Man can perform classic moves such as the chargeable Mega Buster and slide, as well as obtain new weapons by defeating Robot Master bosses at the end of each level. Unique to this game is the Double Gear system, which grants Mega Man two additional abilities: the Speed Gear and Power Gear. The Speed Gear lets Mega Man slow down time, allowing him to dodge attacks, while the Power Gear increases the attack power of Mega Man's weaponry, allowing him to fire two charged shots at the same time or a single, very powerful charged shot; however, there is a limit, showcased by a bar above Mega Man's head, so if Mega Man uses them too much, he will overheat, making him unable to reuse them again for a few seconds. When Mega Man's health is critically low, he can activate both gears at the same time, slowing time and performing a powerful charge shot. This can only be used once and leaves Mega Man weakened after the limit expires: he cannot charge his shots, can only fire a single solar bullet at a time and he will only have one unit of life energy, making the next hit he takes fatal for him, and even the cooldown period where he cannot use the gears is longer because of the severe strains. 

The game has additional features including Time Trials, Missions, Global Leaderboards, a character gallery and more. The game also features difficulty settings, last seen in Mega Man 10, expanding upon them for a total of four: Newcomer, Casual, Normal, and Superhero. The Nintendo Switch version has Amiibo support, which can be used to unlock in-game items.

Plot
The story begins with a flashback of Dr. Light and Dr. Wily when they were students at Robot University at the exact moment they had their falling  out. The committee is debating over choosing either Light's research of robots with independent thoughts or Wily's Double Gear system to continue work on. Despite Wily's objections to Light's ideologies, Light's research was chosen over Wily's. Enraged by his rejection, Wily swears revenge on Light. 
After the flashback ends with Wily waking up disturbed, he suddenly remembers the Double Gear System and begins plotting.

Meanwhile, at his lab, Light, Roll, and Auto are checking up on eight of the latest generation models of Robot Masters for maintenance. Just as they finish with one, Wily barges into the lab and tells Light that he has perfected the Double Gear system before using its Speed Gear to capture the Robot Masters. Mega Man demands Wily release them, but he instead leaves with the robots. Light explains to Mega Man about the Double Gear System and its capabilities, warning him that if Wily really has perfected it, he will not stand a chance. Seeing Mega Man's determination, Light reveals that he kept and repaired the prototype Double Gear System that Wily used to own. After briefly warning Mega Man of its risks, Light installs the Double Gear into Mega Man after several days to help him combat Wily's forces.

After defeating four Robot Masters, Light explains to Mega Man that the Double Gear system was partly responsible for him and Wily falling out. Light believed that if robots were given the power to think for themselves, they could be true partners with humans. Wily, however, stated that even robots who think independently would be mere tools to humans, but by giving them power and speed boosts, then humans would finally respect robots for what they are and any robot could be a hero with the Double Gear System installed. However, when the committee chose Light over Wily, the latter stormed off never forgiving his old friend for not even giving him a chance.

Back in the present, Light muses if he had shown him there was a way to work together instead of telling him that he was wrong, they might have remained friends. Light then gives Mega Man the Rush Jet modification for Rush (Mega Man's robotic pet dog) with Mega Man then setting off to defeat the remaining Robot Masters.

After defeating all eight Robot Masters, Auto attempts to locate Wily, who angrily beckons Mega Man to come to his Gear Fortress so he can deal with him. In response, Mega Man heads to Wily's fortress, defeats his armies, defences and the Robot Masters, and confronts Wily in his new Wily Machine. Upon losing to Mega Man, Wily tries to beg for mercy in slow motion, but Mega Man does not fall for it, much to Wily's ire. Light arrives and tries to coax Wily to make amends, citing Mega Man as an example of their ideas working together, but Wily refuses and escapes, leaving Light dismayed. As the fortress begins to collapse, Auto arrives, telling Light he had finished doing what he asked of him. With that, the three of them escape the collapsing fortress.

Back at the lab, Light reveals he and Auto went to the Gear Fortress to find the parts in order to rebuild the Robot Masters. Auto uses Mega Man's Double Gear System to carry the Robot Masters to the repair room, so they can be sent back to their owners (during which he overheats and faints).

Development
The game was announced in December 2017 as part of the celebration of the series' 30th anniversary, along with the announcements of re-releases of earlier Mega Man games. Mega Man 11 features 3D polygonal characters and hand-drawn environments, departing from the pixel art-based approach from previous games, and is displayed in 2.5D. It was directed by Koji Oda and produced by Kazuhiro Tsuchiya, with character designs by Yuji Ishihara, and music by Marika Suzuki. According to Tsuchiya and Oda, the departure of Mega Man producer Keiji Inafune was mainly the reason for the long hiatus of a new game, as there was a huge hesitation for anyone to step up and become "the new Mega Man guy" until Oda himself did so.

Mega Man 11 was released worldwide for Nintendo Switch, PlayStation 4, Windows, and Xbox One on October 2, 2018, except in Japan where it was released two days later. An alternate soundtrack in the form of a DLC add-on for the game was made freely available to those who pre-ordered the game. A Mega Man Amiibo was released alongside the game for the Switch version. A demo featuring Block Man's stage was released on the Nintendo Switch on September 6, 2018, and on the Xbox One and PlayStation 4 the following day. A version for Amazon Luna was made available on September 9, 2021.

Music

Marika Suzuki was the composer, although she was not responsible for the arranged versions. The music in this game was not as well received as that of previous iterations.

Reception

Mega Man 11 was met with generally favorable reviews by critics. IGN gave it a 7.5/10 rating saying "It's not revolutionary, but Mega Man 11 feels almost like a classic Mega Man game, and is a good foundation for the next 10 games" while GameSpot gave it a 7/10 rating praising the game for its "great sub-bosses and intense robot master fights[,] some new stage gimmicks [being] a lot of fun and endearing personality of the series com[ing] through in the visual and character design", while criticizing the stages for being "far too long and hav[ing] some questionable elements[,] the difficulty spikes throughout levels lead[ing] to frustrating setbacks [and] the Double Gear System never seem[ing] quite as useful as you want it to be". Nintendo Life gave it a 9/10 rating, writing that "Mega Man 11 is an excellent resurgence for the Blue Bomber, imbuing the tried-and-true classic gameplay with modern touches and new ideas that expand on existing concepts in interesting ways."

Sales
During its first week on sale in Japan, the physical Nintendo Switch version of Mega Man 11 sold 14,650 copies, while the physical PlayStation 4 version sold 12,052 copies. As of February 2019, the game sold 870,000 copies worldwide, As of September 2019, the game sold 1.3 million copies worldwide. As of June 2021, the game sold 1.4 million copies worldwide. As of March 31, the game sold 1.5 million copies worldwide. Capcom confirmed in September 30, 2022 that it had sold over 1.6 million copies becoming the best highest selling game in the Mega Man franchise.

Accolades
The game was nominated for "Best Action Game" at The Game Awards 2018, for "Original Light Mix Score, Franchise" at the National Academy of Video Game Trade Reviewers Awards, and for the G.A.N.G. / MAGFEST People's Choice Award at the 2019 G.A.N.G. Awards.

Notes

References

External links
 

2018 video games
Capcom games
Mega Man games
Nintendo Switch games
PlayStation 4 games
PlayStation 4 Pro enhanced games
Side-scrolling platform games
Single-player video games
Video game sequels
Video games developed in Japan
Video games that use Amiibo figurines
Video games with 2.5D graphics
Windows games
Xbox One games
Xbox One X enhanced games